3 Are Legend is an electronic dance music supergroup consisting of Belgian Greek DJs Dimitri Vegas & Like Mike and American DJ Steve Aoki.

Background and career 
3 Are Legend are a supergroup founded by the three DJs who are described as good friends. Dimitri Vegas, Like Mike and Steve Aoki regularly perform at festivals and concerts together, including headlining several major music festivals such as TomorrowWorld, Tomorrowland, Creamfields and Ultra Music Festival, which prompted the formation of the group. The trio's first use of the name came during Ultra 2014, but had previously played together for many years previously.

On July 26, 2019 the super group released a track with W&W named Khaleesi. Two days later the trio closed Tomorrowland for the first time, and on the festival's 15th anniversary. This came after they were inadvertently caught up in a controversy involving fellow supergroup Swedish House Mafia regarding the event's closure aimed unexpected cancellations of a few of the latter's 2019 tour dates.

Discography

Singles

Remixes 
2018: Dimitri Vegas & Like Mike vs. W&W — Crowd Control (3 Are Legend Remix) [Smash The House]

Previous collaborations
2012: Steve Aoki and Angger Dimas vs. Dimitri Vegas & Like Mike — Phat Brahms [Dim Mak]
2014: Steve Aoki and Autoerotique vs. Dimitri Vegas & Like Mike — Feedback [Dim Mak]
2016: Dimitri Vegas & Like Mike and Steve Aoki vs. Ummet Ozcan — Melody [Smash The House]
2017: Dimitri Vegas & Like Mike vs. Steve Aoki — We Are Legend [Self-released, original song made as a demo by Martin Garrix "legend" ]

References

Electronic music supergroups
Musical groups established in 2014